Taihu Wu or Northern Wu is a Wu Chinese language spoken over much of southern part of Jiangsu province, including Suzhou, Wuxi, Changzhou, the southern part of Nantong, Jingjiang and Danyang; the municipality of Shanghai; and the northern part of Zhejiang province, including Hangzhou, Shaoxing, Ningbo, Huzhou, and Jiaxing. A notable exception is the dialect of the town of Jinxiang, which is a linguistic exclave of Taihu Wu in Zhenan Min-speaking Cangnan county of Wenzhou prefecture in Zhejiang province. Speakers in regions around Taihu Lake and Hangzhou Bay, are the largest population among all Wu speakers. Taihu Wu dialects such as Shanghainese, Shaoxing and Ningbo are mutually intelligible even for L2 Taihu speakers.

History
Linguistic affinity has also been used as a tool for regional identity and politics in the Jiangbei and Jiangnan regions. While the city of Yangzhou was the center of trade, flourishing and prosperous, it was considered part of Jiangnan, which was known to be wealthy, even though Yangzhou was north of the Yangzi River. Once Yangzhou's wealth and prosperity were gone, it was then considered to be part of Jiangbei, the "backwater".

After Yangzhou was removed from Jiangnan, many of its residents switched from Jianghuai Mandarin, the dialect of Yangzhou, to Taihu Wu dialects. In Jiangnan itself, multiple subdialects of Wu competed for the position of prestige dialect.

In 1984, around 85 million speakers are mutually intelligible with Shanghainese.

List of Taihu Wu dialect subgroups
Su–Jia–Hu (Suzhou–Jiaxing–Huzhou, 蘇嘉湖小片), also known as Su–Hu–Jia (Suzhou–Shanghai–Jiaxing, 蘇滬嘉小片) –  million speakers in 1987
Suzhou dialect (Jiangsu)
Shanghainese
Jiaxing dialect (Zhejiang)
Wuxi dialect (Jiangsu)
Tiaoxi (苕溪小片, now considered to be a subbranch or sister group to Suzhou–Shanghai–Jiaxing) – 3 million speakers in 1987
Huzhou dialect (Zhejiang)
Southeast Guangde dialect (Anhui)
Northwestern Wu
Piling (毗陵小片, spoken in Jiangsu and Anhui provinces) – 8 million speakers in 1987
Changzhou dialect (Jiangsu)
Hangzhou (杭州小片) – 1.2 million speakers in 1987
Hangzhou dialect (Zhejiang)
Northern Zhejiang
Lin–Shao (臨紹小片) – 7.8 million speakers in 1987
Shaoxing dialect (Zhejiang)
Lin'an (Zhejiang)
Yongjiang 甬江小片 or Mingzhou (明州小片) – 4 million speakers in 1987
Ningbo dialect (Zhejiang)
Zhoushan (Zhejiang)
Jinxiang dialect (金鄉話, appears to be an isolate, but closely related to the Taihu Wu varieties of Northern Zhejiang.)

List of Taihu Wu dialects
Shanghai dialect
Ningbo dialect
Hangzhou dialect
Suzhou dialect
Changzhou dialect
Wuxi dialect
Jiangyin dialect
Qi–Hai dialect
Jinxiang dialect

References

Further reading
 
[Lili Wu is near the confluence of Suzhou, Jiaxing and Shanghai dialects]
 

Wu Chinese